Albert is a surname, and may refer to:
Abraham Adrian Albert (1905–1972), American mathematician
Augustine Albert (1791–1846), French opera singer
A. Albert (fl. 1900), an otherwise unidentified member of the gold-medal winning French 1900 Summer Olympics rugby union team
Barbara Albert, Austrian film-producer and director
Barbara Albert (chemist) (born 1966), German chemist
Carl Albert, American politician
Christian Albert (soldier) (1842-1922), American soldier
Daniel Albert (footballer) (born 1971), Israeli football player
Daniel G. Albert (1901–1983), New York politician and judge
Daniel M. Albert (born 1936), American ophthalmologist and cancer researcher
Darren Albert, Australian rugby league player
David Albert, American professor
Delia Albert, Filipino diplomat
Eddie Albert, American actor
Edward Albert, American actor, son of Eddie Albert
Eugène Albert, Belgian clarinet maker
Eugen d'Albert, Scottish pianist/composer
Félicie Albert, French-born American physicist
Flórián Albert, Hungarian football striker
Frankie Albert, American NFL quarterback
Hans Albert (born 1921), German philosopher
Heinrich Albert, German lawyer and spy
Herman M. Albert (1901–1947), American lawyer and politician
JD Albert, American engineer, educator and inventor
Jeff Albert (born 1980), American baseball coach
Joan Albert (1943–2012), American artist
Jodi Albert, British actress/singer
John David Albert (1810–1899), mountain man
Kenny Albert, American sportscaster, son of Marv Albert
Kurt Albert (1954–2010), German climber
Laura Albert, alleged American author of a literary hoax
Laura Albert (academic), American operations researcher
Marcelin Albert (1851–1921), French cafe owner who led the 1907 revolt of the Languedoc winegrowers.
Marko Albert, Estonian triathlete
Marv Albert, American sportscaster
Michael Albert, American author/editor
Michel Albert, French economist
Mildred Albert, American fashion show producer and radio and television personality
Morris Albert, Brazilian singer/songwriter
Niels Albert (born 1986), Belgian cyclo-cross racing cyclist, World Champion cyclo-cross in 2009 and 2012
Phil Albert (1944–2020), American football coach
Philippe Albert (born 1967), Belgian football defender
Réka Albert (born 1972), Romanian-Hungarian biologist and physicist
Sergio Albert (born 1951), American football player
Sophie Albert (born 1990), Filipina actress
Stephen Albert, American composer
Stew Albert, American activist
Susan Wittig Albert, American author
Thérèse Albert, French actress
Thomas Albert, American composer and educator.
Wellington Albert, Papua New Guinean Rugby League player
Wilhelm Albert (disambiguation), several people with this name
William Albert, American Congressman

See also
Albert (given name)
Albert (disambiguation)
Alpert
Aubert

Germanic-language surnames
Surnames from given names